"Own It" is a song by English rapper Stormzy featuring English singer Ed Sheeran and Nigerian singer Burna Boy, released on 22 November 2019 through #Merky and Atlantic Records as the fourth single from Stormzy's second studio album, Heavy Is the Head. It is Stormzy and Ed Sheeran's second collaboration of 2019, following Sheeran's "Take Me Back to London". It reached number one on the UK Singles Chart in January 2020, becoming Stormzy's third UK number one, and second as a lead artist, as well as Sheeran's ninth. It was also the first number one of the 2020s.

Background
A press release described "Own It" as "another supremely slick release" from Stormzy, writing that his "South London flow [is] aligned to a dancehall-tinged production, [...] with his word play empowering and uplifting a female love interest".

Music video
The video was released on 22 November 2019, the same day as the song. It was directed by Nathan James Tettey and shot in various locations around London.

Charts

Weekly charts

Year-end charts

Certifications

Release history

References

2019 singles
2019 songs
Stormzy songs
Burna Boy songs
Ed Sheeran songs
Songs written by Ed Sheeran
Songs written by Fred Again
Songs written by Stormzy
UK Singles Chart number-one singles
Songs written by Burna Boy